The Championnat National U19 is the highest tier of under-19 football in France. Organized by the French Football Federation, it is contested by 56 clubs that are split into 4 groups.

History 
In 2009, the U18 youth championship of France was split into two age groups; the Championnat National U19, which would replace the U18 league, and the Championnat National U17, a new league for this age category. Before the U18 league, a U17 league existed from 1990 to 2002. The Championnat National U19 became the continuation of the now-disappeared U17 and U18 leagues. On the other hand, the Championnat National U17 is a continuation of the former U15 league from 1990 to 2002 and U16 league from 2002 to 2009.

Format 
The Championnat National U19 is played annually and is contested by 56 clubs, with 55 coming from France and 1 from Monaco. The teams are divided into 4 geographically-determined groups of 14 teams. A season begins in the end of summer and ends in the following spring. In the league phase, every team plays each other twice (home and away) in their respective groups for a total of 26 games played per team. Afterwards, the first and second place teams of each group face off in a play-off phase. The winner of the final is crowned French under-19 champion.

European qualification 
Since 2015, the winner of the Championnat National U19 has qualified for the UEFA Youth League. In a separate path, 2–3 youth teams of Ligue 1 clubs qualified for the UEFA Champions League qualify for the Youth League as well.

Clubs

2021–22 season 
For the 2021–22 season, 56 clubs participated in the Championnat National U19.

Performances by club 
Paris Saint-Germain have won the most Championnat National U19 titles, with four. They are followed by Lyon, Bordeaux, and Rennes, who all have three titles, while Auxerre and Cannes both have two. The title was not awarded for the 2019–20 and 2020–21 seasons due to the COVID-19 pandemic.

See also 
 Coupe Gambardella
Championnat National U17

References

External links 

 Website
Championnat National U19 on Soccerway

Football leagues in France
Under-19 association football competitions
Youth football leagues in Europe

1990 establishments in France
Sports leagues established in 1990